Robin Benson (2 May 1929 – 15 June 2012) was an Irish sailor. He competed in the Dragon event at the 1960 Summer Olympics.

References

External links
 

1929 births
2012 deaths
Irish male sailors (sport)
Olympic sailors of Ireland
Sailors at the 1960 Summer Olympics – Dragon
Sportspeople from Dublin (city)